Lebia bilineata is a species of beetle in the family Carabidae. It is found in Mexico and the United States.

References

Further reading

Lebia
Beetles described in 1859
Beetles of North America
Taxa named by Victor Motschulsky